Rhamphomyia albissima is a species of dance fly in the family Empididae. It is in the subgenus Rhamphomyia (Pararhamphomyia).

References

Rhamphomyia
Insects described in 1913
Asilomorph flies of Europe